Marie Salomea Skłodowska–Curie (born Maria Salomea Skłodowska, ; 7 November 1867 – 4 July 1934) was a Polish and naturalized-French physicist and chemist who conducted pioneering research on radioactivity. She was the first woman to win a Nobel Prize, the first person to win a Nobel Prize twice, and the only person to win a Nobel Prize in two scientific fields. Her husband, Pierre Curie, was a co-winner of her first Nobel Prize, making them the first-ever married couple to win the Nobel Prize and launching the Curie family legacy of five Nobel Prizes. She was, in 1906, the first woman to become a professor at the University of Paris.

She was born in Warsaw, in what was then the Kingdom of Poland, part of the Russian Empire. She studied at Warsaw's clandestine Flying University and began her practical scientific training in Warsaw. In 1891, aged 24, she followed her elder sister Bronisława to study in Paris, where she earned her higher degrees and conducted her subsequent scientific work. In 1895 she married the French physicist Pierre Curie, and she shared the 1903 Nobel Prize in Physics with him and with the physicist Henri Becquerel for their pioneering work developing the theory of "radioactivity"—a term she coined. In 1906 Pierre Curie died in a Paris street accident. Marie won the 1911 Nobel Prize in Chemistry for her discovery of the elements polonium and radium, using techniques she invented for isolating radioactive isotopes.

Under her direction, the world's first studies were conducted into the treatment of neoplasms by the use of radioactive isotopes. She founded the Curie Institute in Paris in 1920, and the Curie Institute in Warsaw in 1932; both remain major medical research centres. During World War I she developed mobile radiography units to provide X-ray services to field hospitals.

While a French citizen, Marie Skłodowska Curie, who used both surnames, never lost her sense of Polish identity. She taught her daughters the Polish language and took them on visits to Poland. She named the first chemical element she discovered polonium, after her native country.

Marie Curie died in 1934, aged 66, at the  sanatorium in Passy, France, of aplastic anemia likely from exposure to radiation in the course of her scientific research and in the course of her radiological work at field hospitals during World War I. In addition to her Nobel Prizes, she has received numerous other honours and tributes; in 1995 she became the first woman to be entombed on her own merits in the Paris , and Poland declared 2011 the Year of Marie Curie during the International Year of Chemistry.

Life

Early years 

Maria Skłodowska was born in Warsaw, in Congress Poland in the Russian Empire, on 7 November 1867, the fifth and youngest child of well-known teachers Bronisława, née Boguska, and Władysław Skłodowski. The elder siblings of Maria (nicknamed Mania) were Zofia (born 1862, nicknamed Zosia),  (born 1863, nicknamed Józio), Bronisława (born 1865, nicknamed Bronia) and Helena (born 1866, nicknamed Hela).

On both the paternal and maternal sides, the family had lost their property and fortunes through patriotic involvements in Polish national uprisings aimed at restoring Poland's independence (the most recent had been the January Uprising of 1863–65). This condemned the subsequent generation, including Maria and her elder siblings, to a difficult struggle to get ahead in life. Maria's paternal grandfather, had been principal of the Lublin primary school attended by Bolesław Prus, who became a leading figure in Polish literature.

Władysław Skłodowski taught mathematics and physics, subjects that Maria was to pursue, and was also director of two Warsaw gymnasia (secondary schools) for boys. After Russian authorities eliminated laboratory instruction from the Polish schools, he brought much of the laboratory equipment home and instructed his children in its use. He was eventually fired by his Russian supervisors for pro-Polish sentiments and forced to take lower-paying posts; the family also lost money on a bad investment and eventually chose to supplement their income by lodging boys in the house. Maria's mother Bronisława operated a prestigious Warsaw boarding school for girls; she resigned from the position after Maria was born. She died of tuberculosis in May 1878, when Maria was ten years old. Less than three years earlier, Maria's oldest sibling, Zofia, had died of typhus contracted from a boarder. Maria's father was an atheist, her mother a devout Catholic. The deaths of Maria's mother and sister caused her to give up Catholicism and become agnostic.

When she was ten years old, Maria began attending the boarding school of J. Sikorska; next, she attended a gymnasium for girls, from which she graduated on 12 June 1883 with a gold medal. After a collapse, possibly due to depression, she spent the following year in the countryside with relatives of her father, and the next year with her father in Warsaw, where she did some tutoring. Unable to enroll in a regular institution of higher education because she was a woman, she and her sister Bronisława became involved with the clandestine Flying University (sometimes translated as Floating University), a Polish patriotic institution of higher learning that admitted women students.

Maria made an agreement with her sister, Bronisława, that she would give her financial assistance during Bronisława's medical studies in Paris, in exchange for similar assistance two years later. In connection with this, Maria took a position first as a home tutor in Warsaw, then for two years as a governess in Szczuki with a landed family, the Żorawskis, who were relatives of her father. While working for the latter family, she fell in love with their son, Kazimierz Żorawski, a future eminent mathematician. His parents rejected the idea of his marrying the penniless relative, and Kazimierz was unable to oppose them. Maria's loss of the relationship with Żorawski was tragic for both. He soon earned a doctorate and pursued an academic career as a mathematician, becoming a professor and rector of Kraków University. Still, as an old man and a mathematics professor at the Warsaw Polytechnic, he would sit contemplatively before the statue of Maria Skłodowska that had been erected in 1935 before the Radium Institute, which she had founded in 1932.

At the beginning of 1890, Bronisława—who a few months earlier had married Kazimierz Dłuski, a Polish physician and social and political activist—invited Maria to join them in Paris. Maria declined because she could not afford the university tuition; it would take her a year and a half longer to gather the necessary funds. She was helped by her father, who was able to secure a more lucrative position again. All that time she continued to educate herself, reading books, exchanging letters, and being tutored herself. In early 1889 she returned home to her father in Warsaw. She continued working as a governess and remained there until late 1891. She tutored, studied at the Flying University, and began her practical scientific training (1890–91) in a chemical laboratory at the Museum of Industry and Agriculture at Krakowskie Przedmieście 66, near Warsaw's Old Town. The laboratory was run by her cousin Józef Boguski, who had been an assistant in Saint Petersburg to the Russian chemist Dmitri Mendeleev.

Life in Paris 
In late 1891, she left Poland for France. In Paris, Maria (or Marie, as she would be known in France) briefly found shelter with her sister and brother-in-law before renting a garret closer to the university, in the Latin Quarter, and proceeding with her studies of physics, chemistry, and mathematics at the University of Paris, where she enrolled in late 1891. She subsisted on her meagre resources, keeping herself warm during cold winters by wearing all the clothes she had. She focused so hard on her studies that she sometimes forgot to eat. Skłodowska studied during the day and tutored evenings, barely earning her keep. In 1893, she was awarded a degree in physics and began work in an industrial laboratory of Gabriel Lippmann. Meanwhile, she continued studying at the University of Paris and with the aid of a fellowship she was able to earn a second degree in 1894.

Skłodowska had begun her scientific career in Paris with an investigation of the magnetic properties of various steels, commissioned by the Society for the Encouragement of National Industry. That same year, Pierre Curie entered her life: it was their mutual interest in natural sciences that drew them together. Pierre Curie was an instructor at The City of Paris Industrial Physics and Chemistry Higher Educational Institution (ESPCI Paris). They were introduced by Polish physicist Józef Wierusz-Kowalski, who had learned that she was looking for a larger laboratory space, something that Wierusz-Kowalski thought Pierre could access. Though Curie did not have a large laboratory, he was able to find some space for Skłodowska where she was able to begin work.

Their mutual passion for science brought them increasingly closer, and they began to develop feelings for one another. Eventually, Pierre proposed marriage, but at first Skłodowska did not accept as she was still planning to go back to her native country. Curie, however, declared that he was ready to move with her to Poland, even if it meant being reduced to teaching French. Meanwhile, for the 1894 summer break, Skłodowska returned to Warsaw, where she visited her family. She was still labouring under the illusion that she would be able to work in her chosen field in Poland, but she was denied a place at Kraków University because of sexism in academia. A letter from Pierre convinced her to return to Paris to pursue a Ph.D. At Skłodowska's insistence, Curie had written up his research on magnetism and received his own doctorate in March 1895; he was also promoted to professor at the School. A contemporary quip would call Skłodowska "Pierre's biggest discovery".

On 26 July 1895, they were married in Sceaux; neither wanted a religious service. Curie's dark blue outfit, worn instead of a bridal gown, would serve her for many years as a laboratory outfit. They shared two pastimes: long bicycle trips and journeys abroad, which brought them even closer. In Pierre, Marie had found a new love, a partner, and a scientific collaborator on whom she could depend.

New elements 

In 1895, Wilhelm Röntgen discovered the existence of X-rays, though the mechanism behind their production was not yet understood. In 1896, Henri Becquerel discovered that uranium salts emitted rays that resembled X-rays in their penetrating power. He demonstrated that this radiation, unlike phosphorescence, did not depend on an external source of energy but seemed to arise spontaneously from uranium itself. Influenced by these two important discoveries, Curie decided to look into uranium rays as a possible field of research for a thesis.

She used an innovative technique to investigate samples. Fifteen years earlier, her husband and his brother had developed a version of the electrometer, a sensitive device for measuring electric charge. Using her husband's electrometer, she discovered that uranium rays caused the air around a sample to conduct electricity. Using this technique, her first result was the finding that the activity of the uranium compounds depended only on the quantity of uranium present. She hypothesized that the radiation was not the outcome of some interaction of molecules but must come from the atom itself. This hypothesis was an important step in disproving the assumption that atoms were indivisible.

In 1897, her daughter Irène was born. To support her family, Curie began teaching at the École Normale Supérieure. The Curies did not have a dedicated laboratory; most of their research was carried out in a converted shed next to ESPCI. The shed, formerly a medical school dissecting room, was poorly ventilated and not even waterproof. They were unaware of the deleterious effects of radiation exposure attendant on their continued unprotected work with radioactive substances. ESPCI did not sponsor her research, but she would receive subsidies from metallurgical and mining companies and from various organizations and governments.

Curie's systematic studies included two uranium minerals, pitchblende and torbernite (also known as chalcolite). Her electrometer showed that pitchblende was four times as active as uranium itself, and chalcolite twice as active. She concluded that, if her earlier results relating the quantity of uranium to its activity were correct, then these two minerals must contain small quantities of another substance that was far more active than uranium. She began a systematic search for additional substances that emit radiation, and by 1898 she discovered that the element thorium was also radioactive. Pierre Curie was increasingly intrigued by her work. By mid-1898 he was so invested in it that he decided to drop his work on crystals and to join her.

She was acutely aware of the importance of promptly publishing her discoveries and thus establishing her priority. Had not Becquerel, two years earlier, presented his discovery to the Académie des Sciences the day after he made it, credit for the discovery of radioactivity (and even a Nobel Prize), would instead have gone to Silvanus Thompson. Curie chose the same rapid means of publication. Her paper, giving a brief and simple account of her work, was presented for her to the Académie on 12 April 1898 by her former professor, Gabriel Lippmann. Even so, just as Thompson had been beaten by Becquerel, so Curie was beaten in the race to tell of her discovery that thorium gives off rays in the same way as uranium; two months earlier, Gerhard Carl Schmidt had published his own finding in Berlin.

At that time, no one else in the world of physics had noticed what Curie recorded in a sentence of her paper, describing how much greater were the activities of pitchblende and chalcolite than uranium itself: "The fact is very remarkable, and leads to the belief that these minerals may contain an element which is much more active than uranium." She later would recall how she felt "a passionate desire to verify this hypothesis as rapidly as possible." On 14 April 1898, the Curies optimistically weighed out a 100-gram sample of pitchblende and ground it with a pestle and mortar. They did not realize at the time that what they were searching for was present in such minute quantities that they would eventually have to process tonnes of the ore.

In July 1898, Curie and her husband published a joint paper announcing the existence of an element they named "polonium", in honour of her native Poland, which would for another twenty years remain partitioned among three empires (Russian, Austrian, and Prussian). On 26 December 1898, the Curies announced the existence of a second element, which they named "radium", from the Latin word for "ray". In the course of their research, they also coined the word "radioactivity".

To prove their discoveries beyond any doubt, the Curies sought to isolate polonium and radium in pure form. Pitchblende is a complex mineral; the chemical separation of its constituents was an arduous task. The discovery of polonium had been relatively easy; chemically it resembles the element bismuth, and polonium was the only bismuth-like substance in the ore. Radium, however, was more elusive; it is closely related chemically to barium, and pitchblende contains both elements. By 1898 the Curies had obtained traces of radium, but appreciable quantities, uncontaminated with barium, were still beyond reach. The Curies undertook the arduous task of separating out radium salt by differential crystallization. From a tonne of pitchblende, one-tenth of a gram of radium chloride was separated in 1902. In 1910, she isolated pure radium metal. She never succeeded in isolating polonium, which has a half-life of only 138 days.

Between 1898 and 1902, the Curies published, jointly or separately, a total of 32 scientific papers, including one that announced that, when exposed to radium, diseased, tumour-forming cells were destroyed faster than healthy cells.

In 1900, Curie became the first woman faculty member at the École Normale Supérieure and her husband joined the faculty of the University of Paris. In 1902 she visited Poland on the occasion of her father's death.

In June 1903, supervised by Gabriel Lippmann, Curie was awarded her doctorate from the University of Paris. That month the couple were invited to the Royal Institution in London to give a speech on radioactivity; being a woman, she was prevented from speaking, and Pierre Curie alone was allowed to. Meanwhile, a new industry began developing, based on radium. The Curies did not patent their discovery and benefited little from this increasingly profitable business.

Nobel Prizes 

In December 1903 the Royal Swedish Academy of Sciences awarded Pierre Curie, Marie Curie, and Henri Becquerel the Nobel Prize in Physics, "in recognition of the extraordinary services they have rendered by their joint researches on the radiation phenomena discovered by Professor Henri Becquerel." At first the committee had intended to honour only Pierre Curie and Henri Becquerel, but a committee member and advocate for women scientists, Swedish mathematician Magnus Gösta Mittag-Leffler, alerted Pierre to the situation, and after his complaint, Marie's name was added to the nomination. Marie Curie was the first woman to be awarded a Nobel Prize.

Curie and her husband declined to go to Stockholm to receive the prize in person; they were too busy with their work, and Pierre Curie, who disliked public ceremonies, was feeling increasingly ill. As Nobel laureates were required to deliver a lecture, the Curies finally undertook the trip in 1905. The award money allowed the Curies to hire their first laboratory assistant. Following the award of the Nobel Prize, and galvanized by an offer from the University of Geneva, which offered Pierre Curie a position, the University of Paris gave him a professorship and the chair of physics, although the Curies still did not have a proper laboratory. Upon Pierre Curie's complaint, the University of Paris relented and agreed to furnish a new laboratory, but it would not be ready until 1906.

In December 1904, Curie gave birth to their second daughter, Ève. She hired Polish governesses to teach her daughters her native language, and sent or took them on visits to Poland.

On 19 April 1906, Pierre Curie was killed in a road accident. Walking across the Rue Dauphine in heavy rain, he was struck by a horse-drawn vehicle and fell under its wheels, fracturing his skull and killing him instantly. Curie was devastated by her husband's death. On 13 May 1906 the physics department of the University of Paris decided to retain the chair that had been created for her late husband and offer it to Marie. She accepted it, hoping to create a world-class laboratory as a tribute to her husband Pierre. She was the first woman to become a professor at the University of Paris.

Curie's quest to create a new laboratory did not end with the University of Paris, however. In her later years, she headed the Radium Institute (Institut du radium, now Curie Institute, Institut Curie), a radioactivity laboratory created for her by the Pasteur Institute and the University of Paris. The initiative for creating the Radium Institute had come in 1909 from Pierre Paul Émile Roux, director of the Pasteur Institute, who had been disappointed that the University of Paris was not giving Curie a proper laboratory and had suggested that she move to the Pasteur Institute. Only then, with the threat of Curie leaving, did the University of Paris relent, and eventually the Curie Pavilion became a joint initiative of the University of Paris and the Pasteur Institute.

In 1910 Curie succeeded in isolating radium; she also defined an international standard for radioactive emissions that was eventually named for her and Pierre: the curie. Nevertheless, in 1911 the French Academy of Sciences failed, by one or two votes, to elect her to membership in the academy. Elected instead was Édouard Branly, an inventor who had helped Guglielmo Marconi develop the wireless telegraph. It was only over half a century later, in 1962, that a doctoral student of Curie's, Marguerite Perey, became the first woman elected to membership in the academy.

Despite Curie's fame as a scientist working for France, the public's attitude tended toward xenophobia—the same that had led to the Dreyfus affair—which also fuelled false speculation that Curie was Jewish. During the French Academy of Sciences elections, she was vilified by the right-wing press as a foreigner and atheist. Her daughter later remarked on the French press's hypocrisy in portraying Curie as an unworthy foreigner when she was nominated for a French honour, but portraying her as a French heroine when she received foreign honours such as her Nobel Prizes.

In 1911 it was revealed that Curie was involved in a year-long affair with physicist Paul Langevin, a former student of Pierre Curie's, a married man who was estranged from his wife. This resulted in a press scandal that was exploited by her academic opponents. Curie (then in her mid-40s) was five years older than Langevin and was misrepresented in the tabloids as a foreign Jewish home-wrecker. When the scandal broke, she was away at a conference in Belgium; on her return, she found an angry mob in front of her house and had to seek refuge, with her daughters, in the home of her friend, Camille Marbo.

International recognition for her work had been growing to new heights, and the Royal Swedish Academy of Sciences, overcoming opposition prompted by the Langevin scandal, honoured her a second time, with the 1911 Nobel Prize in Chemistry. This award was "in recognition of her services to the advancement of chemistry by the discovery of the elements radium and polonium, by the isolation of radium and the study of the nature and compounds of this remarkable element." Because of the negative publicity due to her affair with Langevin, the chair of the Nobel committee, Svante Arrhenius, attempted to prevent her attendance at the official ceremony for her Nobel Prize in Chemistry, citing her questionable moral standing. Curie replied that she would be present at the ceremony, because "the prize has been given to her for her discovery of polonium and radium" and that "there is no relation between her scientific work and the facts of her private life".

She was the first person to win or share two Nobel Prizes, and remains alone with Linus Pauling as Nobel laureates in two fields each. A delegation of celebrated Polish men of learning, headed by novelist Henryk Sienkiewicz, encouraged her to return to Poland and continue her research in her native country. Curie's second Nobel Prize enabled her to persuade the French government to support the Radium Institute, built in 1914, where research was conducted in chemistry, physics, and medicine. A month after accepting her 1911 Nobel Prize, she was hospitalised with depression and a kidney ailment. For most of 1912, she avoided public life but did spend time in England with her friend and fellow physicist, Hertha Ayrton. She returned to her laboratory only in December, after a break of about 14 months.

In 1912 the Warsaw Scientific Society offered her the directorship of a new laboratory in Warsaw but she declined, focusing on the developing Radium Institute to be completed in August 1914, and on a new street named Rue Pierre-Curie. She was appointed Director of the Curie Laboratory in the Radium Institute of the University of Paris, founded in 1914. She visited Poland in 1913 and was welcomed in Warsaw but the visit was mostly ignored by the Russian authorities. The institute's development was interrupted by the coming war, as most researchers were drafted into the French Army, and it fully resumed its activities in 1919.

World War I 

During World War I, Curie recognised that wounded soldiers were best served if operated upon as soon as possible. She saw a need for field radiological centres near the front lines to assist battlefield surgeons, including to obviate amputations when in fact limbs could be saved. After a quick study of radiology, anatomy, and automotive mechanics she procured X-ray equipment, vehicles, auxiliary generators, and developed mobile radiography units, which came to be popularly known as petites Curies ("Little Curies"). She became the director of the Red Cross Radiology Service and set up France's first military radiology centre, operational by late 1914. Assisted at first by a military doctor and her 17-year-old daughter Irène, Curie directed the installation of 20 mobile radiological vehicles and another 200 radiological units at field hospitals in the first year of the war. Later, she began training other women as aides.

In 1915, Curie produced hollow needles containing "radium emanation", a colourless, radioactive gas given off by radium, later identified as radon, to be used for sterilizing infected tissue. She provided the radium from her own one-gram supply. It is estimated that over a million wounded soldiers were treated with her X-ray units. Busy with this work, she carried out very little scientific research during that period. In spite of all her humanitarian contributions to the French war effort, Curie never received any formal recognition of it from the French government.

Also, promptly after the war started, she attempted to donate her gold Nobel Prize medals to the war effort but the French National Bank refused to accept them.  She did buy war bonds, using her Nobel Prize money. She said:She was also an active member in committees of Polonia in France dedicated to the Polish cause. After the war, she summarized her wartime experiences in a book, Radiology in War (1919).

Postwar years 
In 1920, for the 25th anniversary of the discovery of radium, the French government established a stipend for her; its previous recipient was Louis Pasteur (1822–95). In 1921, she was welcomed triumphantly when she toured the United States to raise funds for research on radium. Mrs. William Brown Meloney, after interviewing Curie, created a Marie Curie Radium Fund and raised money to buy radium, publicising her trip.

In 1921, U.S. President Warren G. Harding received her at the White House to present her with the 1 gram of radium collected in the United States, and the First Lady praised her as an example of a professional achiever who was also a supportive wife. Before the meeting, recognising her growing fame abroad, and embarrassed by the fact that she had no French official distinctions to wear in public, the French government offered her a Legion of Honour award, but she refused. In 1922 she became a fellow of the French Academy of Medicine. She also travelled to other countries, appearing publicly and giving lectures in Belgium, Brazil, Spain, and Czechoslovakia.

Led by Curie, the Institute produced four more Nobel Prize winners, including her daughter Irène Joliot-Curie and her son-in-law, Frédéric Joliot-Curie. Eventually it became one of the world's four major radioactivity-research laboratories, the others being the Cavendish Laboratory, with Ernest Rutherford; the Institute for Radium Research, Vienna, with Stefan Meyer; and the Kaiser Wilhelm Institute for Chemistry, with Otto Hahn and Lise Meitner.

In August 1922 Marie Curie became a member of the League of Nations' newly created International Committee on Intellectual Cooperation. She sat on the committee until 1934 and contributed to League of Nations' scientific coordination with other prominent researchers such as Albert Einstein, Hendrik Lorentz, and Henri Bergson. In 1923 she wrote a biography of her late husband, titled Pierre Curie. In 1925 she visited Poland to participate in a ceremony laying the foundations for Warsaw's Radium Institute. Her second American tour, in 1929, succeeded in equipping the Warsaw Radium Institute with radium; the Institute opened in 1932, with her sister Bronisława its director. These distractions from her scientific labours, and the attendant publicity, caused her much discomfort but provided resources for her work. In 1930 she was elected to the International Atomic Weights Committee, on which she served until her death. In 1931, Curie was awarded the Cameron Prize for Therapeutics of the University of Edinburgh.

Death 

Curie visited Poland for the last time in early 1934. A few months later, on 4 July 1934, she died aged 66 at the Sancellemoz sanatorium in Passy, Haute-Savoie, from aplastic anemia believed to have been contracted from her long-term exposure to radiation, causing damage to her bone marrow.

The damaging effects of ionising radiation were not known at the time of her work, which had been carried out without the safety measures later developed. She had carried test tubes containing radioactive isotopes in her pocket, and she stored them in her desk drawer, remarking on the faint light that the substances gave off in the dark. Curie was also exposed to X-rays from unshielded equipment while serving as a radiologist in field hospitals during the war.  In fact, when Curie's body was exhumed in 1995, the French Office de Protection contre les Rayonnements Ionisants (ORPI) "concluded that she could not have been exposed to lethal levels of radium while she was alive". They pointed out that radium poses a risk only if it is ingested, and speculated that her illness was more likely to have been due to her use of radiography during the First World War.

She was interred at the cemetery in Sceaux, alongside her husband Pierre. Sixty years later, in 1995, in honour of their achievements, the remains of both were transferred to the Paris Panthéon. Their remains were sealed in a lead lining because of the radioactivity. She became the second woman to be interred at the Panthéon (after Sophie Berthelot) and the first woman to be honoured with interment in the Panthéon on her own merits.

Because of their levels of radioactive contamination, her papers from the 1890s are considered too dangerous to handle. Even her cookbooks are highly radioactive. Her papers are kept in lead-lined boxes, and those who wish to consult them must wear protective clothing. In her last year, she worked on a book, Radioactivity, which was published posthumously in 1935.

Legacy 

The physical and societal aspects of the Curies' work contributed to shaping the world of the twentieth and twenty-first centuries. Cornell University professor L. Pearce Williams observes:

If Curie's work helped overturn established ideas in physics and chemistry, it has had an equally profound effect in the societal sphere. To attain her scientific achievements, she had to overcome barriers, in both her native and her adoptive country, that were placed in her way because she was a woman. This aspect of her life and career is highlighted in Françoise Giroud's Marie Curie: A Life, which emphasizes Curie's role as a feminist precursor.

She was known for her honesty and moderate lifestyle. Having received a small scholarship in 1893, she returned it in 1897 as soon as she began earning her keep. She gave much of her first Nobel Prize money to friends, family, students, and research associates. In an unusual decision, Curie intentionally refrained from patenting the radium-isolation process so that the scientific community could do research unhindered.  She insisted that monetary gifts and awards be given to the scientific institutions she was affiliated with rather than to her. She and her husband often refused awards and medals. Albert Einstein reportedly remarked that she was probably the only person who could not be corrupted by fame.

Honours and tributes 

As one of the most famous scientists in history, Marie Curie has become an icon in the scientific world and has received tributes from across the globe, even in the realm of pop culture.

In 1995, she became the first woman to be entombed on her own merits in the Panthéon, Paris.

In a 2009 poll carried out by New Scientist, she was voted the "most inspirational woman in science". Curie received 25.1 percent of all votes cast, nearly twice as many as second-place Rosalind Franklin (14.2 per cent).

On the centenary of her second Nobel Prize, Poland declared 2011 the Year of Marie Curie; and the United Nations declared that this would be the International Year of Chemistry. An artistic installation celebrating "Madame Curie" filled the Jacobs Gallery at San Diego's Museum of Contemporary Art. On 7 November, Google celebrated the anniversary of her birth with a special Google Doodle. On 10 December, the New York Academy of Sciences celebrated the centenary of Marie Curie's second Nobel Prize in the presence of Princess Madeleine of Sweden.

Marie Curie was the first woman to win a Nobel Prize, the first person to win two Nobel Prizes, the only woman to win in two fields, and the only person to win in multiple sciences. Awards that she received include:
 Nobel Prize in Physics (1903, with her husband Pierre Curie and Henri Becquerel)
 Davy Medal (1903, with Pierre)
 Matteucci Medal (1904, with Pierre)
 Actonian Prize (1907)
 Elliott Cresson Medal (1909)
 Nobel Prize in Chemistry (1911)
 Franklin Medal of the American Philosophical Society (1921)

She received numerous honorary degrees from universities across the world. In Poland, she received honorary doctorates from the Lwów Polytechnic (1912), Poznań University (1922), Kraków's Jagiellonian University (1924), and the Warsaw Polytechnic (1926).  In 1920 she became the first female member of The Royal Danish Academy of Sciences and Letters. In 1921, in the U.S., she was awarded membership in the Iota Sigma Pi women scientists' society. In 1924, she became an Honorary Member of the Polish Chemical Society. Marie Curie's 1898 publication with her husband and their collaborator Gustave Bémont of their discovery of radium and polonium was honoured by a Citation for Chemical Breakthrough Award from the Division of History of Chemistry of the American Chemical Society presented to the ESPCI Paris in 2015.

Entities that have been named in her honour include:

 The curie (symbol Ci), a unit of radioactivity, is named in honour of her and Pierre Curie (although the commission which agreed on the name never clearly stated whether the standard was named after Pierre, Marie, or both).
 The element with atomic number 96 was named curium.
 Three radioactive minerals are also named after the Curies: curite, sklodowskite, and cuprosklodowskite.
 The Marie Skłodowska-Curie Actions fellowship program of the European Union for young scientists wishing to work in a foreign country is named after her.
 In 2007, a metro station in Paris was renamed to honour both of the Curies.
 the sole Polish nuclear reactor in operation, the research reactor Maria, is named after her.
 The 7000 Curie asteroid is also named after her.
 A KLM McDonnell Douglas MD-11 (registration PH-KCC) is named in her honour.
 In 2011, a new Warsaw bridge over the Vistula River was named in her honour.
 In January 2020, Satellogic, a high-resolution Earth observation imaging and analytics company, launched a ÑuSat type micro-satellite; ÑuSat 8, also known as Marie, was named in her honour.
 The Marie-Curie station, a planned underground Réseau express métropolitain (REM) station in the borough of Saint-Laurent in Montreal is named in her honour.  A nearby road, Avenue Marie Curie, is also named in her honour.
 The molecular docking task CurieMariedock is a component of the Slovenian distributed computing project SiDock (which runs under the aegis of BOINC); its focus is SARS‑CoV‑2.
 Mount Curie in New Zealand's Paparoa Range was named after her in 1970 by the Department of Scientific and Industrial Research.

Several institutions presently bear her name, including the two Curie institutes which she founded: the Maria Sklodowska-Curie National Research Institute of Oncology in Warsaw, and the Institut Curie in Paris. The Maria Curie-Skłodowska University, in Lublin, was founded in 1944; and the Pierre and Marie Curie University (also known as Paris VI) was France's pre-eminent science university, which would later merge to form the Sorbonne University. In Britain, the Marie Curie charity was organized in 1948 to care for the terminally ill.
Two museums are devoted to Marie Curie. In 1967, the Maria Skłodowska-Curie Museum was established in Warsaw's "New Town", at her birthplace on ulica Freta (Freta Street). Her Paris laboratory is preserved as the Musée Curie, open since 1992.
Curie's likeness has appeared on banknotes, stamps and coins around the world. She was featured on the Polish late-1980s 20,000-złoty banknote as well as on the last French 500-franc note, before the franc was replaced by the euro. Curie-themed postage stamps from Mali, the Republic of Togo, Zambia, and the Republic of Guinea actually show a picture of Susan Marie Frontczak portraying Curie in a 2001 picture by Paul Schroeder.
Her likeness or name has appeared on several artistic works. In 1935, Michalina Mościcka, wife of Polish President Ignacy Mościcki, unveiled a statue of Marie Curie before Warsaw's Radium Institute; during the 1944 Second World War Warsaw Uprising against the Nazi German occupation, the monument was damaged by gunfire; after the war it was decided to leave the bullet marks on the statue and its pedestal. Her name is included on the Monument to the X-ray and Radium Martyrs of All Nations, erected in Hamburg, Germany in 1936. In 1955 Jozef Mazur created a stained glass panel of her, the Maria Skłodowska-Curie Medallion, featured in the University at Buffalo Polish Room. In 2011, on the centenary of Marie Curie's second Nobel Prize, an allegorical mural was painted on the façade of her Warsaw birthplace. It depicted an infant Maria Skłodowska holding a test tube from which emanated the elements that she would discover as an adult: polonium and radium.

In popular culture 
Numerous biographies are devoted to her, including:
 Ève Curie (Marie Curie's daughter), Madame Curie, 1938.
 Françoise Giroud, Marie Curie: A Life, 1987.
 Barbara Goldsmith, Obsessive Genius: The Inner World of Marie Curie, 2005.
 Lauren Redniss, Radioactive: Marie and Pierre Curie, a Tale of Love and Fallout, 2011, adapted into the 2019 British film.

Marie Curie has been the subject of a number of films:
 1943: Madame Curie, a U.S. Oscar-nominated film by Mervyn LeRoy starring Greer Garson.
 1997: Les Palmes de M. Schutz, a French film adapted from a play of the same title, and directed by Claude Pinoteau. Marie Curie is played by Isabelle Huppert.
 2016: Marie Curie: The Courage of Knowledge, a European co-production by Marie Noëlle starring Karolina Gruszka.
 2019: Radioactive, a British film by Marjane Satrapi starring Rosamund Pike.

Curie is the subject of the 2013 play, False Assumptions, by Lawrence Aronovitch, in which the ghosts of three other women scientists observe events in her life. Curie has also been portrayed by Susan Marie Frontczak in her play, Manya: The Living History of Marie Curie, a one-woman show which by 2014 had been performed in 30 U.S. states and nine countries.

See also 

 Charlotte Hoffman Kellogg, who sponsored Marie Curie's visit to the US
 Eusapia Palladino: Spiritualist medium whose Paris séances were attended by an intrigued Pierre Curie and a skeptical Marie Curie
 Marie Curie Medal
 Genius, television series depicting Einstein's life
 List of female Nobel laureates
 List of female nominees for the Nobel Prize
 List of multiple discoveries (1898 discovery of thorium radioactivity)
 List of Poles (Chemistry)
 List of Poles (Physics)
 List of Polish Nobel laureates
 Maria Skłodowska-Curie Museum, Warsaw, Poland
 Marie Curie Gargoyle (1988), at University of Oregon
 Poles
 Timeline of women in science
 Treatise on Radioactivity, by Marie Curie
 Women in chemistry

Notes

References

Further reading

Nonfiction 

  translated by Lydia Davis.

Fiction 
  A 2004 novel by Per Olov Enquist featuring Maria Skłodowska-Curie, neurologist Jean-Martin Charcot, and his Salpêtrière patient "Blanche" (Marie Wittman). The English translation was published in 2006.

External links 

 
 
 
 
 
 

 
1867 births
1934 deaths
19th-century French chemists
19th-century French inventors
19th-century French physicists
19th-century French women scientists
19th-century Polish chemists
19th-century Polish inventors
19th-century Polish physicists
19th-century Polish women scientists
20th-century French chemists
20th-century French inventors
20th-century French physicists
20th-century French women scientists
20th-century Polish chemists
20th-century Polish inventors
20th-century Polish physicists
20th-century Polish women scientists
Burials at the Panthéon, Paris
Congress Poland emigrants to France
Corresponding Members of the Russian Academy of Sciences (1917–1925)
Corresponding members of the Saint Petersburg Academy of Sciences
Corresponding Members of the USSR Academy of Sciences
Marie
Deaths from anemia
Discoverers of chemical elements
Experimental physicists
Former Roman Catholics
French agnostics
French atheists
French Nobel laureates
French nuclear physicists
French women chemists
French women physicists
Honorary Members of the USSR Academy of Sciences
Inventors killed by their own invention
Légion d'honneur refusals
Members of the Lwów Scientific Society
Naturalized citizens of France
Nobel laureates in Chemistry
Nobel laureates in Physics
Nobel laureates with multiple Nobel awards
Nuclear chemists
People from Warsaw Governorate
Polish agnostics
Polish atheists
Polish governesses
Polish Nobel laureates
Polish nuclear physicists
Recipients of the Matteucci Medal
Scientists from Warsaw
University of Paris alumni
Academic staff of the University of Paris
Victims of radiological poisoning
Women inventors
Women Nobel laureates
Women nuclear physicists
Flying University alumni